Victor Miguel de Freitas Gomes (born 15 December 1982) is a South African football referee.

A PSL referee since 2008, Gomes was voted PSL Referee of the Season in 2012–13 and 2017–18 and has been an international referee since 2011.

In 2018, he was hailed by the South African Football Association after he rejected and reported an attempted bribe of over R300000. Gomes had been approached and offered the sum of money to fix a CAF Confederation Cup match between Nigerian side Plateau United and Algerian side USM Alger. He was again nominated for the PSL Referee of the Season award upon the conclusion of the domestic campaign.

He officiated the 2019 and 2021 edition of Africa Cup of Nations. He refereed the 2021 Africa Cup of Nations Final between Senegal and Egypt.

References

1982 births
Living people
South African soccer referees
2022 FIFA World Cup referees
FIFA World Cup referees
South African people of Portuguese descent
Sportspeople from Johannesburg